Naeem Anjum (born 15 September 1987, in Mandi Bahauddin) is an international cricketer from Pakistan. He was part of the bronze medal winning team at the 2010 Asian Games.

Career

A wicket-keeper and batsman, in November 2010 Anjum was part of the Pakistan cricket team at the Asian Games in Guangzhou, China which won a bronze medal by beating Sri Lanka in the 3rd place playoffs.

He has played for Islamabad in the Quaid-i-Azam Trophy since his first-class debut in 2006-07. In 2013-14 he captained the Pakistan Television team in the President’s Trophy first-class competition.

References

External links
 Naeem Anjum at CricketArchive

1987 births
Living people
People from Mandi Bahauddin District
Pakistani cricketers
Cricketers at the 2010 Asian Games
Asian Games bronze medalists for Pakistan
Asian Games medalists in cricket
Federal Areas cricketers
Islamabad Leopards cricketers
Medalists at the 2010 Asian Games